Gao Xiaosong (born 14 November 1969) is a Chinese American composer, songwriter, music producer, and director. He was the Chairman of Alibaba Entertainment Strategic Committee and AliMusic.

In 2009, Gao was appointed Honorary President of Beijing Contemporary Music Academy. In 2015, Gao founded the nonprofit Zashuguan Library and has been its curator since then. The library has a collection of over 800,000 books and documents, the majority of which were published during the Ming and Qing dynasties and the Republic of China period.

Gao is a pro-democracy activist in mainland China. Over the years he has spread the idea of American democracy and Western culture to a wide Chinese viewers through online video platforms such as iQIYI, and he is a fierce critic of Chinese Communist Party's official historical narrative, political system and ideology. In September 2021, his works were banned by Chinese authorities.

Career in music
1988 Graduated from Beijing No.4 High School
1988 entered Department of Electronic Engineering, Tsinghua University, majoring in Radar
1991 Dropped out of Tsinghua University and attended the preparatory course for postgraduate study of film directing in Beijing Film Academy
1993 Issued debut album Collegiate Ballads 1, which won almost all the prizes of pop music that year. In the years that followed, worked as a composer of both music and lyrics, sometimes the producer.
Founded Taihe Rye Music in 1996, the previous biggest music label in Mainland China till Gao founded Evergrande Music  in 2010
Previous Broad Member and Music Director of Evergrande Music
As the founder and most influential musician of Chinese Campus Folk Music, sold 15 million records
1999 Director and music composer of expressionist film Where Have All the Flowers Gone
Has been the chairman of two national major music awards since 2011
The only Chinese who is able to hold personal works concert in all the major cities in China and USA. Set box office records in cosmopolitans such as Beijing, Shanghai, Shenzhen, Nanjing, etc.
Produced Silence for Na Ying in 2015, topped the music charts in China for two months
Produced Jasmine for Celine Dion in 2013
Produced Alive for Sa Dingding, which won the BBC Radio 3 World Music Award in 2008 and topped the iTunes world music download
Wrote and produced song "Feng Qing Yang(Man with the wind)" for Alibaba founder Jack Ma and mandopop diva Faye Wong. The song created a bid stir among Chinese social network like Weibo and WeChat, it got more than 250 million hits by the first day. The song is also the theme song of Jack Ma's martial arts short movie "Gong Shou Dao".
Served as the main judge for more than 10 talent shows, such as China's Got Talent, which enjoyed as high as 5.7% viewership
Served as the Chairmen of Alibaba Music Group from Jul. 2015 
Served as the Chairman of Alibaba Entertainment Strategic Committee from Sep. 2016 
On May 4, 2020, Musician Gao Xiaosong, as the chief planner, initiated the First online charity performance-"Believe in the Future" with Chinese-speaking musicians. It was jointly launched by Damai subordinated by Alibaba Entertainment Group, Weibo, NetEase Cloud Music, Xiami Music, and Tencent Music Entertainment Group with participation of nearly 300 groups of famous artists including KUN Cai , Langlang , CoCo Lee , Chis Lee ,Faye Wong, Kris Wu , Jackson Yee , Zhou Xun, Chis Lee,etc., and resulted in attracting a total of 440 million online viewers, 5.04 billion Weibo topic reads, and 9. 297 million Weibo discussions. Meanwhile it was broadcast live by 57 Chinese video platforms worldwide, covered by 179 media organizations and was described as the largest online charity performance in the history of Chinese music.

Talk Show Host

Xiaosong Pedia: Jun 2014- Dec 2016
Xiaosong Pedia is a cultural talk show premiered on June 6, 2014 at iQiy. Produced by Gao Xiaosong studio under the iQiyi network, hosted by Gao Xiaosong.
 During August 2016, as the host of the talkshow, Xiaosong accused a Canadian government-backed tourism organization of trying to censor Xiaosong Pedia.
Xiaosong Pedia ends in Dec 2016, hundred million Chinese netizens mourn the demise of Xiaosong Pedia. The show received more 900m views during its two-and-a-half-year run.

Morning Call: March 2012- Jun 2014
No. 1 online Talk Show in the world; releases every Friday morning at 8 am on Youku (Nasdaq: yoku), swept all the talk show awards in China
Iqiyi, the Chinese version of Netflix, beat the old cooperative partner Youku among other competitors and won the bid of airing the show for the next three season at a price of 16 million dollars, highest ever in China for a talk show
The show has accumulated viewership of over 850 million, highest in the world; one recent episode has over 40 million hits, has also set the record high
Each episode receives 1-2 million RMB sponsorships. Main sponsors include: Infinity, DHL, Lenovo, Samsung, Mini Cooper and Tourism Bureaus from more than 10 countries 
The show is purchased to play on high speed rails, airports, airlines, high-end shuttle buses, national TVs, etc.
The scripts of the first 24 episodes have been published. Over 400,000 were sold. The following episodes will be published in 2015.

Today in History: January 2013- December 2013
A daily talk show that has highest viewership on Dragon TV, the scripts have been published in China.

Film Director
Active since 1999
Wrote, composed and produced his fifth feature film My Old Classmate, which obtained half of the national gross box office on its first day of release on Friday, April 25, 2014. The film has topped the Chinese national box office for nine consecutive days and accumulated a box office of 80 million USD. The film also ranks top in the hashtag ranking of "Chinese Twitter" (weibo) for weeks, let alone beating other films that had much higher budgets such as Iceman, Captain America, Rio 2, The Demon Within, etc. 
Directed and composed the music for his fourth feature film My Kingdom, produced by Andre Morgan (the producer of Million Dollar Baby, The Warlords etc.); Action Director was Sammo Hung; Released in September 2011 in China, USA (AMC), Australia, New Zealand, Hong Kong, Singapore, Malaysia, Indonesia, Vietnam, etc. The box office in China accumulated to 10 million USD. The film was first runner-up on the box office chart for September 2011. 
Directed and composed the music for his third feature and first American film Fragile, This Side Up, Keep Dry in 2006, produced by Alain Siritzky and Jean Chalopin.
Directed and composed the music for his second feature film Rainbow in 2002, starring Chen Daoming and Li Xiaolu.
Directed and composed the music for his first feature film Where Have All the Flowers Gone in 1999, starring Zhou Xun (Best Actress Award, the 15th Paris Film Festival) and Xia Yu (Best Actor, Venice Film Festival 1994).

Novelist & Author
Active since 2000
Published Face on the Wall in 2000 and sold over 180,000 copies 
Published Like a Song in 2009 and sold over 500,000 copies
Books to published in 2014 include two volumes of the scripts Morning Call and 6 volumes of Today in History

Personal life
Gao Xiaosong’s father Gao Liren (born 1942) was a photographer and a professor at Tsinghua University. His mother Zhang Kequn, born 1942 in Berlin to physicists Zhang Wei and Lu Shijia, was an architect and a faculty member at Tsinghua University. She was also a grandniece of Shi Jinmo.

Gao married Shen Huan in 1999. They  divorced in 2002. In 2007, he married Xu Canjin. The couple had a daughter. They divorced in 2013.

On May 9, 2011, Gao was arrested after being involved in a road traffic accident in Beijing. He was convicted of reckless driving and driving while drunk, and was sentenced to six months in prison. Gao afterwards spoke out against drunken driving, saying “When wine is in, wit is out. Please draw a lesson from my case.”

References

1969 births
Living people
China's Got Talent
Musicians from Beijing
People's Republic of China composers
Chinese record producers
Chinese songwriters
Beijing No. 4 High School alumni
Chinese television talk show hosts